Duane Carter (May 5, 1913 – March 7, 1993) was an American racecar driver. He raced midget cars, sprint cars, and IndyCars. Carter was born in Fresno, California, and he died in Indianapolis, Indiana. His son Pancho raced in Indy cars, along with Johnny Parsons (whom he helped raise).

Racing career

Midget cars
Carter started racing midgets at the 1/5 mile dirt track in the west side of Fresno while attending Fresno State University. He was one of six drivers who went to Western Springs Stadium in Auckland, New Zealand in 1937. He won the first ever midget car race at that track. The car he drove still exists in a museum in Auckland. He was a consistent winner on the Nutley board track in 1939 while future journalist Chris Economaki was his unofficial crew chief. He won the 1940 Detroit VFW Motor Speedway title, the 1942 championship at Sportsman Park in Cleveland. He captured a 500 lap victory in his midget car at the 1947 Los Angeles Coliseum Motordome after Danny Oakes was initially declared the winner.

Sprint cars
He moved up to the sprint cars, and won the 1950 Midwest division.

Indy Cars
He drove in the AAA and USAC Championship Car series, racing in the 1948-1955, 1959–1960, and 1963 seasons with 47 starts, including the Indianapolis 500 races in each season.  He finished in the top ten 23 times, with his best finish in 2nd position in 1953 at Phoenix. In his last race, at the Indy 500, he drove the innovative John Crosthwaite designed  Harvey Aluminium Special ‘roller skate car’ with the then pioneering low profile, wide racing tyres and a stock Chevrolet engine.

USAC director
He retired from competition in 1956 to take the Competition Director position for USAC. He returned to competition in 1959 after Henry Banks took over the position.

Career awards
Carter was inducted into the Fresno County Athletic Hall of Fame in 1967.
He was inducted in the National Sprint Car Hall of Fame in 1991.
He was inducted in the National Midget Auto Racing Hall of Fame in 1989.

Indianapolis 500 results

* shared drive with Sam Hanks

** shared drive with Troy Ruttman

This currently ranks 5th on the all-time list.

Complete Formula One World Championship results
(key)

 † Indicates shared drive with Sam Hanks after retiring his own car.
 * Indicates shared drive with Troy Ruttman. Carter's own car finished 15th after being taken over by Marshall Teague, Jimmy Jackson and Tony Bettenhausen.

References

1913 births
1993 deaths
24 Hours of Le Mans drivers
Bonneville 200 MPH Club members
Indianapolis 500 drivers
National Sprint Car Hall of Fame inductees
Sportspeople from Fresno, California
Racing drivers from California
Racing drivers from Fresno, California
AAA Championship Car drivers
World Sportscar Championship drivers
Carrera Panamericana drivers